The Times-Standard is the only major local daily newspaper covering the far North Coast of California. Headquartered in Eureka, the paper provides coverage of international, national, state and local news in addition to entertainment, sports, and classified listings. On the local level, the paper extensively covers all of Humboldt County while providing partial coverage of neighboring Del Norte, Mendocino, and Trinity counties. The newspaper is one of the oldest continuously published papers in all of California, with several papers predating it by three years or less.

History
Established by E.D. Coleman in 1854, the Humboldt Times began publishing in what is known today as Old Town Eureka. The first issue of the Humboldt Times was printed on September 2, 1854. Another daily newspaper, the Humboldt Standard, began publishing in 1875. After a lengthy period of spirited competition and then a period of joint ownership with separate operations, the two papers merged in 1967 to form what is now the Times-Standard. According to an older version of the newspaper's "about us" section of its web page, moving day came on December 7, 1968. Staff writer Andrew Genzoli later recalled, "There hadn’t been so much excitement in the newsroom since Pearl Harbor".

Throughout its history Humboldt County has been the site of several county-wide or regional newspapers. They include the Humboldt Bay Journal (1865–1867), National Index (1867–1868), Humboldt Bay Democrat (1868), Northern Independent (1869–1872) and finally the West Coast Signal which began in 1871 and lasted until 1880. The advent of the telegraph in the 1870s encouraged the development of even more newspapers, some dailies and some weeklies. They included the Evening Star (1876–1878), Evening Herald (1879), Eureka News/News/Semi-Weekly News (1881) and finally Western Watchman (1884–1898) and Humboldt Mail (1887–1890). But the Times-Standard has been the only major daily newspaper of record for all Humboldt County for much of the county's history. In 1967, it passed out of local, family ownership into a newspaper chain, Brush-Moore Newspapers, which was acquired by Thomson Newspapers the same year. Thomson owned the Times-Standard until 1996 when it was bought by MediaNews Group, who sold it to Digital First Media in June 2016.

However, from 2003 to 2008, the Times-Standard was the subject of vigorous competition through the establishment of another daily newspaper, The Eureka Reporter. But, Humboldt County and other areas of the North Coast (reached by local papers), though quite large in geographical terms, is a small population area to feature two daily newspapers. As a result, in late 2008 (after a brief period of reduced publication), The Eureka Reporter announced that it would cease operations.

In early 2012, The Times-Standard ceased printing a Monday edition, publishing Monday news exclusively online. 

Following a long history of publishing its print editions in Eureka, the newspaper decommissioned its in-house printing press in 2020 and began delivering copies to Humboldt County from Chico, California.

Awards
The Times-Standard received the Newspaper Association of America's Award of Excellence in the 2008 Media Innovation Awards competition.

References

External links
Official website
Newspaper's history
Humboldt library

Eureka, California
Mass media in Humboldt County, California
Publications established in 1854
Daily newspapers published in California
1854 establishments in California